The Kolb Flyer Powered Parachute is an American powered parachute that was designed and produced by New Kolb Aircraft of London, Kentucky. Now out of production, when it was available the aircraft was supplied as a complete ready-to-fly-aircraft.

The Flyer was the second of three company aircraft to bear the same name, after the 1970 Kolb Flyer and followed by the 2008 production Kolb Flyer Super Sport, a version of the Canadian Ultravia Pelican. Introduced about 2001, The powered parachute was a break from previous Kolb designs, which were otherwise all fixed wing aircraft and was embarked upon to give the company a foothold in the then-expanding North American powered parachute market.

Design and development
It could also qualify as a US FAR 103 Ultralight Vehicles rules two-seat trainer. It features a  parachute-style wing, two-seats-in-tandem accommodation, tricycle landing gear and a single  Rotax 582 liquid-cooled engine in pusher configuration.

The aircraft carriage is built from bolted metal tubing. In-flight steering is accomplished via foot pedals that actuate the canopy brakes, creating roll and yaw. On the ground the aircraft has lever-controlled nosewheel steering. The main landing gear incorporates spring rod suspension.

Operational history
In July 2015 one example was registered in the United States with the Federal Aviation Administration as an experimental aircraft.

Specifications (Flyer)

References

Flyer
2000s United States sport aircraft
2000s United States ultralight aircraft
Single-engined pusher aircraft
Powered parachutes